Athyma fortuna is a butterfly of the family Nymphalidae. It is found in the East Palearctic.

Subspecies
A. f. diffusa Leech (Central China)
A. f. kodahirai (Sonan, 1938) (Japan)
A. f. guangxiensis Wang, 1994 (China: Guangxi)

References
 Funet

Butterflies described in 1889
Athyma
Butterflies of Asia
Taxa named by John Henry Leech